Karahan is a village in Mau district, Uttar Pradesh, India.

Notable people from the village include the saint Mir Shamsi, his descendant Ali Jawad Zaidi, and Shamim Karhani.
Guradri mathh is famous place where as Shiv mandir is one of the favourite temple. The market is in progress day by day since 2014. Nowadays, A rooms are available for rent to open the Shop as per wish of the shopkeeper.

There is a government inter college Janta inter college, 3 degree colleges, 1 post graduate college and 4 primary schools and nearest 10+ private schools and inter college.

Villages in Mau district